The 1970 Nevada Wolf Pack football team represented the University of Nevada, Reno during the 1970 NCAA College Division football season. Nevada competed as an independent. The Wolf Pack were led by second-year head coach Jerry Scattini and played their home games at Mackay Stadium.

Schedule

References

Nevada
Nevada Wolf Pack football seasons
Nevada Wolf Pack football